Bellowing Room is the seventh studio album by experimental electronic music ensemble Biota, released in 1987 by Recommended Records.

Track listing

Personnel 
Adapted from the Bellowing Room liner notes.

Biota
 Tom Katsimpalis – instruments, illustrations, production, mixing
 Mark Piersel – instruments, production, engineering, mixing
 Steve Scholbe – instruments, production, mixing
 William Sharp – instruments, production, engineering, mixing
 Gordon H. Whitlow – instruments, production, mixing
 Larry Wilson – instruments, production, mixing

Production and additional personnel
 Ti Birchrose – illustrations
 Heidi Eversley – illustrations
 Jean Michel Papillon – illustrations
 Dana Sharp – illustrations
 Mareye Yeates – illustrations

Release history

References

External links 
 Bellowing Room at Discogs (list of releases)

1987 albums
Biota (band) albums
Recommended Records albums